Michael H. Reichmann (25 June 1944 – 18 May 2016), better known by his monogram MR, was a Canadian landscape, travel and street fine-arts photographer, as well as videographer, author, blogger, workshopper, independent technical consultant, camera tester, software developer and entrepreneur.

Reichmann was the president of Batteries Included in the mid-1980s. In his various capacities at Batteries Included, he was frequently interviewed in consumer and industry publications such as InfoWorld.

He founded one of the earliest web sites dedicated to photography, The Luminous Landscape (LuLa), between 1995 and 1997. In his last years, he created the Luminous Endowment project, a charitable fund to assist talented photographers through grants. Both projects are continued by Kevin Raber and others.

Reichmann proposed a new digital exposure method called exposing to the right (ETTR) in 2003. He was also an advocate of open raw image file formats.

Reichmann died in 2016 of bladder cancer.

See also 

 Canadian Broadcasting Corporation (CBC)

 Sinar
 Panasonic

 Voice over IP

 The Nature Conservancy
 OpenRAW

References

Further reading

External links 
 
 "The Luminous Landscape" project
 "The Luminous Endowment" project

1944 births
2016 deaths
Landscape photographers
Nature photographers
Travel photographers
Street photographers
Canadian portrait photographers
People from Toronto
Canadian people of German descent
Deaths from bladder cancer
Deaths from cancer in Ontario